The women's omnium competition  at the 2019 European Games was held at the Minsk Velodrome on 29 June 2019.

Results

Scratch race

Tempo race

Elimination race

Points race

Final ranking
The final ranking is given by the sum of the points obtained in the 4 specialties.

References

Women's omnium